In mathematical logic, System U and System U− are pure type systems, i.e. special forms of a typed lambda calculus with an arbitrary number of sorts, axioms and rules (or dependencies between the sorts). They were both proved inconsistent by Jean-Yves Girard in 1972. This result led to the realization that Martin-Löf's original 1971 type theory was inconsistent as it allowed the same "Type in Type" behaviour that Girard's paradox exploits.

Formal definition 
System U is defined as a pure type system with
 three sorts ;
 two axioms ; and
 five rules .

System U− is defined the same with the exception of the  rule.

Intuitively, the sorts describe a hierarchy in the nature of the terms.
   All values have a type, such as a base type (e.g.  is read as “ is a boolean”) or a (dependent) function type (e.g.  is read as “ is a function from natural numbers to booleans”).
    is the sort of all such types ( is read as “ is a type”). The rules restrict how we can form new kinds.
    is the sort of all such kinds ( is read as “ is a kind”). Similarly we can build related terms, according to what the rules allow.
    is the sort of all such terms.

The rules govern the dependencies between the sorts:  says that values may depend on values (functions),  allows values to depend on types (polymorphism),  allows types to depend on types (type operators), and so on.

Girard's paradox 
The definitions of System U and U− allow the assignment of polymorphic kinds to generic constructors in analogy to polymorphic types of terms in classical polymorphic lambda calculi, such as System F. An example of such a generic constructor might be (where k denotes a kind variable)

.

This mechanism is sufficient to construct a term with the type  (equivalent to the type ), which implies that every type is inhabited. By the Curry–Howard correspondence, this is equivalent to all logical propositions being provable, which makes the system inconsistent.

Girard's paradox is the type-theoretic analogue of Russell's paradox in set theory.

References

Further reading 
 
 

Lambda calculus
Proof theory
Type theory